Annex B may refer to:

An annex of the Kyoto Protocol for fighting global warming; see List of Kyoto Protocol signatories
Integrated Services Digital Network, a digital telephony standard